mir-399 is a microRNA that was identified in both Arabidopsis thaliana and Oryza sativa computationally and was later experimentally verified. mir-399 is thought to target mRNAs coding for a phosphate transporter. The mature sequence is excised from the 3' arm of the hairpin. There are multiple copies of MIR399 in each plant genome, for example A. thaliana contains six microRNA precursors that all give rise to an almost identical mature miR-399 sequence.

References

Further reading

External links
 
 miRBase family MIPF0000015

MicroRNA
MicroRNA precursor families